Kyle Cheney may refer to:

 Kyle Cheney (footballer) (born 1989), Australian rules footballer
 Kyle Cheney (journalist), journalist for Politico